Mar Vista Senior High (MVH), in Imperial Beach, California, United States, is a high school established in 1951.

Mar Vista has an award-winning marine science academy called Poseidon. Students spend grades 9-12 in the academy. It is frequently called "a school within a school." An NJROTC program is also located on campus.

Notable alumni
 Brian Bilbray, 1970 - Member of the U.S. House of Representatives from California's 50th district; former mayor of Imperial Beach, California; former San Diego County supervisor
 Charlie Jackson, 1967 - founder of Silicon Beach Software and FutureWave Software
 Esteban Loaiza, 1990 - professional baseball player
 Dr. Eleanor Connie Mariano, 1973 - Rear Admiral, US Navy; served as White House Physician under President Bill Clinton and President George W. Bush
 Matthew Modine, 1977 - actor
 Jerry Overton, 1958 - professional football player
 Tracy Lynn Cruz, 1994 - actress

References

External links
School website
 Alumni website

Educational institutions established in 1951
High schools in San Diego County, California
Public high schools in California
1951 establishments in California